HX3 may refer to:
 a hepoxilin
 HX3 postcode, one of the postcodes in the area of Halifax